James Ormond or Ormonde may refer to:

 Jimmy Ormond (born 1977), English cricketer
 James Ormond (administrator) (died 1497), Lord High Treasurer of Ireland, 1492–1494
 James Ormond (alpine skier) (born 1973), British alpine skier
 James Ormonde (Australian politician) (1903–1970), Australian politician